Mirja Ojanen (born 27 November 1967 in Hämeenkyrö) is a Finnish ski-orienteering competitor. She won a silver medal in the long distance at the 1992 World Ski Orienteering Championships, and a silver medal in the relay with the Finnish team.

See also
 Finnish orienteers
 List of orienteers
 List of orienteering events

References

1967 births
Living people
People from Hämeenkyrö
Finnish orienteers
Female orienteers
Ski-orienteers
Sportspeople from Pirkanmaa